Colonel (Ret.) Gaillard (Gail) R. Peck Jr. (born October 31, 1940) was a career officer in the United States Air Force.  He is best known as creator of the Constant Peg training program that trained United States airmen against a collection of MiG fighter jets.

Decorations
  Silver Star
  Legion of Merit (2 awards)
  Distinguished Flying Cross (3 awards)
  Defense Meritorious Service Medal
  Meritorious Service Medal
  Air Medal (several)

External links

Biography from the National Museum of the United States Air Force

1940 births
Living people
Recipients of the Silver Star
Recipients of the Legion of Merit
United States Air Force officers
Recipients of the Air Medal
Recipients of the Distinguished Flying Cross (United States)